The BAFTA TV Awards, or British Academy Television Awards are presented in an annual award show hosted by the BAFTA. They have been awarded annually since 1955.

Background
The first-ever Awards, given in 1955, consisted of six categories. Until 1958, they were awarded by the Guild of Television Producers and Directors. From 1958 onwards, after the Guild had merged with the British Film Academy, the organisation was known as the Society of Film and Television Arts. In 1976, this became the British Academy of Film and Television Arts.

From 1968 until 1997, the BAFTA Film and Television awards were presented in one joint ceremony known simply as the BAFTA Awards, but in order to streamline the ceremonies from 1998 onwards they were split in two. The Television Awards are usually presented in April, with a separate ceremony for the Television Craft Awards on a different date. The Craft Awards are presented for more technical areas of the industry, such as special effects, production design, or costumes.

The Awards are only open to British programmes—with the exception of the audience-voted Audience Award and the International Award (this is for a single programme or series acquired from the international marketplace, covering all genres)—but any cable, satellite, terrestrial or digital television stations broadcasting in the UK are eligible to submit entries, as are independent production companies who have produced programming for the channels. Individual performances, such as from actors, can either be entered by the performers themselves or by the broadcasters. The programmes being entered must have been broadcast on or between January and December of the preceding year to be eligible for the year's awards. Entry is free, and entry forms are made available between November and January each year.

After all the entries have been received, they are voted for online by all eligible members of the Academy. The programmes and performances attracting the most votes, usually four in each category, are shortlisted as the nominees for each award. The winner is chosen from the four nominees by a special jury of nine academy members for each award, the members of each jury selected by the Academy's Television Committee. Each jury is designed to have a balance in areas such as sex, age and experience, and have experience related to the categories concerned but no direct connections to the short-listed programmes or performers.

There are also a number of non-competitive honorary Awards—the Dennis Potter Award for Outstanding Writing for Television; the Alan Clarke Award for Outstanding Creative Contribution to Television; the Richard Dimbleby Award for Outstanding Presenter in the Factual Arena; the Fellowship for individuals who have made an outstanding contribution to television across their careers, and various Special Awards given on an ad hoc basis. These Awards are suggested by the Television Committee and awarded by the Academy's Council. They are not necessarily always given every year, but as and when appropriate.

The Awards ceremony is broadcast on British television, usually the day after it has taken place. Between 1998 and 2006, it was alternated between ITV and BBC One. But since 2007, it has been broadcast by BBC One.

They are the equivalent of the Primetime Emmy Awards in the United States.

"Baftagate"
In 1991, a controversial selection was made in the Best Drama Serial category, when Prime Suspect beat G.B.H. to win the award. Following the ceremony, four of the seven voting members of the jury signed a public statement declaring that they had voted for G.B.H. to win. Jury chairperson Irene Shubik, who did not cast a vote, refused to comment publicly on the affair, but BAFTA Chairman Richard Price stated that the ballot papers passed on to him by Shubik had shown four votes for Prime Suspect and three for G.B.H. Price claimed that the ballot papers could not be recounted as they had subsequently been destroyed. No blame was ever attached to Shubik by the four judges, and it was to her that they had initially turned to raise the apparent discrepancy with BAFTA.

Categories
The main competitive award categories presented every year are:

Awards in the gift of the Academy
 Fellowship
 Special Award
 Writer Award
 Most Important Contribution On-Screen in Factual Television

Production Categories
Best Single Drama: A drama where one self-contained story is told in a single one-off episode, equivalent to a television movie. 
Best Mini-Series: A drama that tells a complete story and is not intended to return. 
Best Drama Series: A drama which consists of several episodes, that is intended to return.
Best Soap and Continuing Drama: A drama which transmits a minimum of twenty episodes per year. 
Best International Programme
Best Factual Series or Strand: More than one factual programme linked through a unified approach, narrative or the thematic development of a subject matter.
Best Specialist Factual: Specifically for arts, history, natural history or science programs or series, either factual or performance-based.
Best Single Documentary: For a one-off documentary not presented as part of a regular series. 
Best Features: For programmes not included in any other category, for example cookery, gardening, lifestyle or discussion programmes.
 Best Daytime: For programmes that air on terrestrial channels eg. BBC One, ITV etc. from 6:00AM 'till 6:00PM.
Best Reality and Constructed Factual: For programmes where participants are put into an environment or format and then observed interacting in situations devised by the producer.
Best Short Form
Best Current Affairs: For single films, or films from a strand that are primarily concerned with unfolding current affairs.
Best News Coverage: For an individual news programme in its entirety, or up to one hour's unedited. material from a rolling news channel.
Best Live Event
Best Sport
Best Entertainment Programme: Includes variety shows, game shows, quizzes, talent shows, and all general entertainment programmes. 
Best Comedy Entertainment Program: Includes panel-led shows, chat shows where comic content plays a big part, stand-up and comedy clip shows.
Best Scripted Comedy: For sitcoms.
Best Actor
Best Actress
Best Supporting Actor
Best Supporting Actress
Best Entertainment Performance
Best Female Comedy Performance
Best Male Comedy Performance

Other Categories
Virgin TV's Must See Moment

Discontinued Categories
Best Comedy Performance: Divided in 2010 into female performance and male performance.
 Children's Programme – Documentary-Educational: Awarded from 1983 to 1996.
 Children's Programme – Entertainment-Drama: Awarded from 1983 to 1996.
 Short Animation: Awarded from 1984 to 1991.
 Talk Show: Awarded in 1996 and 1997.
 Richard Dimbleby for The Best Presenter – Factual, Features and News: Awarded from 2000 to 2002.
 Single Play: Awarded from 1973 to 1982.

Ceremonies

See also
British Academy of Film and Television Arts
British Academy Film Awards
British Academy Television Craft Awards
British Academy Games Awards
National Television Awards

Notes

References

External links

 
1955 establishments in the United Kingdom
Annual television shows
Award ceremonies in the United Kingdom
Awards established in 1955
Television
British television awards